Eduard Kazimirovich Tisse (13 April 1897  – 18 November 1961) was a Soviet cinematographer.

Early life and career

He was born to an Estonian Swedish father and Russian mother in Liepāja; he grew up in Liepāja and studied both painting and photography.

Tisse started his career as a newsreel cameraman working under difficult conditions. 
From 1916 to 1918, he worked as a military cameraman. In 1921, Tisse became a professor at Gerasimov Institute of Cinematography. His career did not take off until he worked with director Sergei Eisenstein on the film Strike. Tisse would become Eisenstein's standard cinematographer for the next twenty years.

Tisse, along with Eisenstein and Grigori Alexandrov went on a trip in 1929. They traveled to Europe and the United States with the intent of finding new sound equipment and creating connections between Hollywood and the Soviet film industry. Eisenstein signed with Paramount Pictures and trio headed to California. They worked on several pictures, but nothing was actually produced. Through Eisenstein, photojournalist Margaret Bourke-White met Tisse and in 1932, collaborated with her on Eyes on Russia (1933); this would be Bourke-White's only attempt at film making.

In 1942, Tisse worked on the film In The Mountains of Yugoslavia with Soviet filmmaker Abram Room. The film focused on the character Slavko Babic, his life and death, as well as the Yugoslav Partisan liberation during World War II. The film proved to be very influential for future Yugoslav filmmakers.

His favorite camera was the Debrie Parvo, which he continued to use even during the sound era to film silent sequences.

Selected filmography
Strike (1924); directed by Sergei Eisenstein
The Battleship Potemkin (1925); directed by Sergei Eisenstein
October: Ten Days That Shook the World (1928); directed by Sergei Eisenstein
Aerograd (1935); directed by Alexander Dovzhenko
¡Que viva México! (1937); directed by Sergei Eisenstein
Alexander Nevsky (1938); directed by Sergei Eisenstein
Ivan the Terrible (1944–46); directed by Sergei Eisenstein
The Immortal Garrison; 1956

References

External links
 
 
 
 

1897 births
1961 deaths
People from Liepāja
People from Courland Governorate
Russian people of Estonian descent
Russian people of Swedish descent
Soviet cinematographers
Academic staff of the Gerasimov Institute of Cinematography
Latvian cinematographers